Luca Lucini (born 26 November 1967) is an Italian film director.

Filmography
Three Steps Over Heaven (2004)
L'uomo perfetto (2005)
Amore, bugie e calcetto (2008)
Solo un padre (2008)
Oggi sposi (2009)
The Woman of My Dreams (2010)
Best Enemies Forever (2016)
Alex & Co: How to Grow Up Despite Your Parents (2016)

References

External links 

1967 births
Living people
Italian film directors